Sweet Leaf Tea Company is a producer of ready-to-drink organic branded teas and lemonades, owned by Nestlé. It was founded in Beaumont, TX in 1998 by Clayton Christopher and David Smith. 

On April 2, 2008, Sweet Leaf Tea Company announced $18 million in private funding from Catterton Partners. On May 29, 2008, Sweet Leaf Tea Company filed suit against an Arizona-based company for the name of their sweetener, SweetLeaf Stevia.

History
Sweet Leaf Tea was founded in 1998 in Beaumont, TX by Clayton Christopher, using $10,000 and his grandmother's recipe for home-brewed iced tea made with cane sugar. Early production consisted of brewing tea in crawfish pots in Hen's kitchen, using pillow cases as "tea bags" and; then using garden hoses to transport the tea to plastic bottles.

In March 2009, Nestlé Waters North America invested $15.6 million in the company. In 2012, Clayton Christopher stepped down as CEO and was succeeded by former Nestlé General Manager Dan Costello.

In April 2010, Sweet Leaf acquired Cincinnati-based Tradewinds Beverage Co.

In 2012, Sweet Leaf replaced the organic brewed tea used in the original recipes with organic tea concentrate.

Products
Teas

 Organic Original Sweet Tea
 Diet Original Sweet Tea
 Organic Mint & Honey Green Tea
 Organic Citrus Green Tea
 Diet Citrus Green Tea
 Organic Peach Sweet Tea
 Organic Lemon Sweet Tea
 Raspberry Sweet Tea
 Lemon Lime Unsweet Tea
 Organic Half & Half Lemonade Tea
 Diet Mint & Honey Green Tea (discontinued)
 Diet Peach Sweet Tea (discontinued)
 Organic Mango Green Tea (discontinued)
 Organic Pomegranate Green Tea (discontinued)

Lemonades

 Organic Original Lemonade
 Organic Peach Lemonade (discontinued)
 Organic Cherry Limeade (discontinued)

Headquarters

Sweet Leaf is headquartered in the Penn Field Business Park in the South Congress area of Austin, Texas.

Sweet Leaf originally had its headquarters in Beaumont, Texas. The headquarters moved to Austin in October 2003. In the mid-2000s, Sweet Leaf had its headquarters in an area west of Downtown Austin. In 2007, Sweet Leaf relocated to the South Congress area. In April 2009, the company began to look for a larger headquarters space. In October 2009, Sweet Leaf announced that it planned to move its headquarters to a LEED certified building during that month. In December 2009, the company moved its headquarters to the Penn Field Business Park in South Congress.

See also

 List of companies based in Austin, Texas

References

External links
Sweet Leaf Tea Company

Manufacturing companies based in Austin, Texas
History of Beaumont, Texas
Food and drink companies established in 1998
Iced tea brands
Nestlé brands